Articles (arranged alphabetically) related to Cameroon include:

A
Patrice Abanda
Abbia (game)
Abbia: Cameroon Cultural Review
Théophile Abega
Hamadjoda Adjoudi
Abong-Mbang
Accord de Coopération Économique Monetaire et Financière
Achirimbi II
Simon Achidi Achu
Act of Berlin
Modibo Adama
Adamawa languages
Adamawa Plateau
Adamawa Region
Administering Authority
Administrative divisions of Cameroon
Issa Adoum
Advisory Council (Kamerun)
Afade language
Osende Afana
Afo-A-Kom
1972 African Cup of Nations
African Peoples Union
African socialism
African Union
AfricaPhonebook/Annuaires Afrique
Afriland First Bank
Agadir Crisis
Agriculture in Cameroon
Agroindustry strategy of Cameroon
Agropastoral Show
Ahmadou Ahidjo
Ahidjo-Biya conflict
AIDS/HIV in Cameroon
Aigle Royal Menoua
Cameroon Air Force
Yaou Aïssatou
Akonolinga
Akwa, Douala
Betote Akwa
Dika Mponda Akwa
Sirry Alang
Alcan in Africa
All Anglophone Conference
Alliance for Democracy and Development
Alliance for the Reconstruction of Cameroon through the Sovereign National Conference (ARC-SNC)
Allied Front for Change
Nicolas Alnoudji
ALUBASSA
ALUCAM
Aluminum in Cameroon
Ali Amadou (Amadou Ali)
Ambam
Ambas Bay
Ambasse bey
Ambazonia
American Presbyterian Mission
American School of Yaoundé
Oumarou Aminou
Amorphoscelis pallida
Bassey William Andem
Emile Andze Andze
Gilbert Andze Tsoungui
Benoît Angbwa
Didier Angibeaud
Anglo-Duala Treaty
Anglophone Cameroonian
Anglophone problem
Anglophone Standing Committee
Anlu
Anti-Bamileke incidents
Armed Forces of Cameroon
Aro Confederacy
Aro history
Aro people
Artisanal industries of Cameroon
Art Wash
Charles Assalé
Assemblée Legislative du Cameroun (ALCAM)
Assemblée Territoriale du Cameroun; Territorial Assembly of Cameroon (ATCAM)
Marie-Thérèse Assiga Ahanda
Assiko
Association des Guides du Cameroun
Assimilation policy
Association policy
Association policy of the European Economic Community
Benoît Assou-Ekotto
Les Astres FC
Charles Atangana
Jean-Marie Atangana Mebara
Jean-Hugues Ateba
Atelier Viking
Joseph Atemengue
Atlantic Equatorial coastal forests
Atlantika Mountains
Timothée Atouba
Louis-Paul Aujoulat
Joseph Chongwas Awunti
Axis International Lines
Paul Abine Ayah
Luc Ayang
Henri Eyebe Ayissi
Joseph Gaudérique Aymerich

B
Baboua
Babungo language
Babungo Museum
Babungo people
Baccalaureat (Cameroon)
Bafang
Bafia
Bafia people
Bafoussam
Bafut language
Bafut people
Bafut Subdivision
Bafut, Cameroon
Bafut, Fon of
Bafut, traditional administrative system of
Bafut Wars
Baggara Arabs
Bahá'í Faith in Cameroon
Baham Museum
Gustave Bahoken
Bajwe
Baka (Cameroon and Gabon)
Baka Beyond
Issa Bakary
Bakassi
Bakassi Movement for Self-Determination (BAMOSD)
Bakebe
Bakoko people
Bakole language
Bakole people
Bakossi Mountains
Bakossi people
Bakweri; Kpe
Bakweri Cooperative Union of Farmers (BCUF)
Bakweri Land Claim Committee
Balanced Development
Baldemu language
Bali, Cameroon
Bambili
Bamboko
Bamboutos FC
Bambui
Bamenda
Bamenda Airport
Bamenda All-Party Conference
Bamenda Congress
Bamenda Improvement Association
Bamenda Proclamation
Bamenda University of Science and Technology (BUST)
Bamileke
Bamileke languages
Bamkin
Bamum, Kingdom of
Bamum people
Bamum, Rulers of the
Bamum language
Bana, Cameroon
Bana language
Bananas in Cameroon
Banda people
Bandjoun
Bandjoun Museum
Henri Bandolo
Bank of Central African States; Banque d'États de L'Afrique Centrale (BEAC)
Economic crisis of Cameroon
Bantowbol
Bantu peoples
Banyo, Cameroon
Baptist Mission to Cameroon
Basel Mission
Basaa language
Bassa people (Cameroon)
Isabelle Bassong
Bata language
Joseph Batangdon
Batié, Cameroon
Batouri
Battle of Kousséri
Bayang, Lanao del Sur; Banyang; Banyangi
BeBe Zahara Benet
Francis Bebey
Marcel Bebey-Eyidi
Beboid languages
John Beecroft
Jean-Pierre Bekolo
Bélabo
Jean Pierre Amougou Belinga
Joseph-Antoine Bell
Muhammed Bello
Patrick Bengondo
Bello Bouba Maigari
Carl Jacob Bender
Bend-skin
Alphonse Beni
Bénoué National Park
Benue River
Berlin Conference (1884)
Bertoua
Beti-Pahuin
Hortense Béwouda
André Bikey
Bikutsi
Bikya language
Bilingualism in Cameroon
Bight of Bonny
Moni Bilé
Benoit Bindzi
Biosphere reserves in Cameroon, list of
Omgba Bissogo
Bitis gabonica
Biu-Mandara A languages
Biu-Mandara A.3 languages
Biu-Mandara A.4 languages
Biu-Mandara A.5 languages
Biu-Mandara A.7 languages
Biu-Mandara A.8 languages
Biu-Mandara B languages
Chantal Biya
Emmanuel Franck Biya
Jeanne-Irène Biya
Paul Biya
Alexandre Biyidi
Yondo Mandengue Black
Black-collared lovebird
Bloc démocratique camerounais (BDC)
Beatrice Bofia
Suzy Bofia
Bokito, Cameroon
Gibering Bol Alima
Richard Bona
Bonabéri
Jacques-Roger Booh-Booh
Border conflicts in Cameroon
Bouba Njida National Park
Alioum Boukar
Boumba Bek National Park
Jean-Alain Boumsong
Yannick Boumsong
Ruben Boumtje-Boumtje
Pierre Boya
Serge Branco
Brasseries du Cameroun
Brazzaville Conference of 1944
Brevet d'Etudes du Premier Cycle (BEPC)
Brigade Mixte Mobile
Briqueterie
British Cameroons
Buduma language
Buduma people
Buea
Buea Declaration
Bulu
Bulu language
Bung language
Le Bus
Bushmeat
Bush taxi
Buwal language
Bwiti

C
Caledonian Airways Flight 153
Cameroon
Cameroon Airlines
Cameroon Anglophone Movement (CAM)
Cameroon Cup
Cameroon Democratic Union (CDU); Union Démocratique Camerounaise (UDC)
Cameroon Development Corporation (CDC)
Cameroon government ministries
Cameroon line
Cameroon National Assembly election, 1992
Cameroon National Assembly election, 1997
Cameroon National Assembly election, 2004
Cameroon national basketball team
Cameroon national cricket team
Cameroon national football team
Cameroon National Union (CNU); Union Nationale Camerounaise (UNC)
Cameroon Oil Transportation Company
Cameroon Outlook
Cameroon People's Democratic Movement (CPDM); Mouvement Démocratique du Peuple Camerounais (MDPC); Rassemblement Démocratique du Peuple Camerounais (RDPC)
Cameroon Premiere Division
Cameroon presidential election, 1992
Cameroon presidential election, 1997
Cameroon presidential election, 2004
Foreign relations of Cameroon
Cameroon Times (Kamerun Times)
Cameroon Trade Union Congress (CTUC)
Cameroon Tribune
Cameroon United Congress (CUC)
Cameroon – United States relations
Cameroon v. the United Kingdom (Northern Cameroons case)
Cameroons Youth League (CYL)
Cameroon Welfare Union (CWU)
Cameroonian Football Federation
Cameroonian Highlands forests
Cameroonian Palace Guard Revolt
Cameroonian Patriotic Opposition
Cameroonian Pidgin English
Cameroonian Union
List of Cameroonians
Cameroons National Federation (CNF)
Cameroons Peoples' National Convention (CPNC)
Cameroons Province
Cameroons Youth League (CYL)
Cameroun
Cameroun Actualites
Camfranglais
Campo, Cameroon
Campo Ma'an National Park
Campo River
Camrail
CAMSUCO
Camtel
Canon Sportif de Yaoundé
Cassava
Catholicism in Cameroon
Catholic University of Central Africa
CDC Workers Union
Cellulose du Cameroun (CELLUCAM)
Centre Region (Cameroon)
Centre-South Province; Centre-South Region
Central African Clearing House
Central African Customs and Economic Union (CACEU)
Central African Monetary Union; Union Monetaire de l'Afrique Centrale; Zone Monetaire Centrafricaine
Central African Republic
Centre National des Etudes et des Recherches (CENER)
Certificat de Fin d'Etudes Primaires Elementaires (CEPE)
CFA franc
Chad
Chad Basin Commission
Chad-Cameroon Petroleum Development and Pipeline Project
Chantal Biya Foundation
Chari River
Joseph_Chila
Chocolat (1988 film)
Chomba
Theodor Christaller
Christianity in Cameroon
Cimenteries du Cameroun (CIMENCAM)
Cinema in Cameroon
Cire perdu casting
.cm
Cocoa in Cameroon
Cocoyam; Colocasia; Taro
Coffee in Cameroon
Andrew Cohen (colonial governor)
Collective Resignation Plot
List of colonial heads of Ambas Bay
List of colonial heads of British Cameroons
List of colonial heads of French Cameroon
List of colonial heads of French Equatorial Africa
List of colonial heads of German Cameroon
Comazar
Commissioners and High Commissioners of France in Cameroon
Commonwealth of Nations
Cameroon at the 2006 Commonwealth Games
Commonwealth of Independent States
Communal liberalism
Communauté
Communauté Économique des États de l'Afrique Centrale (CEEAC); Economic Community of Central African States (ECCAS)
Communauté Financière Africaine
Telecommunications in Cameroon
List of companies of Cameroon
Compte hors budget
Concours (Cameroon)
Cameroons Condominium
Confederation of Anglophone Parents-Teachers Associations of Cameroon (CAPTAC)
Confederation of Cameroon Trade Unions (CCTU)
Conference of Heads of State of Equatorial Africa
Republic of the Congo
Congress of Berlin
Constitution of Cameroon
Constitution of the Federal Republic of Cameroon (1961)
Constitution of the Republic of Cameroon (1984)
Constitution of the Republic of Cameroon (1996)
Constitution of the Republique du Cameroun (1960)
Constitution of the United Republic of Cameroon (1972)
Constitutional Council of Cameroon
Cooperatives in Cameroon
Corruption in Cameroon
Cotonnière Industrielle du Cameroun (CICAM)
Cotonsport Garoua
Cotton Development Company (SODECOTON)
Cotton in Cameroon
Council of Notables
1984 Cameroonian coup attempt
Coupeur de route
Courant d'Union Nationale (CUN)
Court of Appeal of Cameroon
Court of equity
Court of Impeachment
Credit Foncier
Credit unions in Cameroon
Cross River Region
Cross–Sanaga–Bioko coastal forests
Cuisine of Cameroon
Cultural renewal
Culture of Cameroon
Cuvok language

D
Daba language
Dakolé Daïssala
Usman dan Fodio
Gidago dan Laima
Sadou Daoudou
Youssoufa Daouda
Debt of Cameroon
Robert DeLavignette
Democracy in Cameroon
Demographics of Cameroon
Deng Deng National Park
Destabilisation plot of 22 August 1983
Armand Deumi
Development Bank of Central African States; Banque de Développement des États de l'Afrique Centrale (BDEAC)
Manu Dibango
R. Jabea K. Dibongue
Henri Dikongué
Jean-Pierre Dikongué Pipa
Dimako
Direction Générale d'Etudes et de la Documentation (DIRDOC)
Departments of Cameroon
Dizangue
Dja Faunal Reserve
Eric Djemba-Djemba
Djoum
Charles Macpherson Dobell
Hans Dominik
Michel Doo Kingue
Douala
Douala International Airport
Rudolph Douala
Douala Stock Exchange
Doual'art
Joseph-Charles Doumba
Jean-Joël Perrier-Doumbé
Ofir Drori
Dschang
Duala, Rulers of the
Duala language
Duala people
Dugwor language

E
East Cameroon (Cameroun Oriental)
East Region (Cameroon)
East Sudanian savanna
Eastern Region, Nigeria
Karl Ebermaier
Ebolowa
Fred Salle
Samuel Eboua
Eco Guard
Economic Community of Central African States
United Nations Economic and Social Council
Economic crisis of Cameroon
Economy of Cameroon
Ecoregions in Cameroon, list of
Edéa
Education in Cameroon
Titus Edzoa
L'Effort Camerounais
Emmanuel Egbe-Tabi
Eid ul-Fitr
Nzo Ekangaki
Eugène Ekéké
Marthe Ekemeyong Moumié
Catherine Eko
Ekoi people
Ekoid languages
Thierry Ekwalla
Joseph Elanga
Namata Henry Elangwe
Elections in Cameroon
Mbonda Elie
Essomba Tsoungui Elie Victor
George Elokobi
Jacques Elong Elong
Achille Emaná
Embassy of Cameroon in Moscow
Embassy of Cameroon in Washington, D.C.
David Embé
Emblem of Cameroon
Emia-Ema Constitution
E. M. L. Endeley
Joël Epalle
Equatorial Guinea
Espérance FC
Laurent Esso
Jean Pierre Essome
William-Aurelian Eteky Mboumoua
Ethnic conflict in Cameroon
Etoko, Cameroon
Samuel Eto'o
European Economic Community (EEC)
Evangelical Lutheran Church of Cameroon
Évolué
Ewale a Mbedi
Ewonde a Kwane
Ewondo
Ewondo language
L'Expression de Mamy-Wata

F
Nana Falemi
Fali languages (Cameroon)
Fang
Fang language
Far North Region (Cameroon)
Faro National Park
Fe'fe' language
Federal Inspector of Administration
Federal National Assembly of Cameroon
Fertile Crescent (Cameroon)
Lake Fianga
List of Cameroonian films
Samuel_Finlak
Firewood in Cameroon
First School Leaving Certificate (FSLC)
Flag of Cameroon
Jean Fochive
Marc-Vivien Foé
Fon (Cameroon)
John Ngu Foncha
Fonds d'Aide et de Coopération; Fonds d'Investissements pour le Développement Économique et Social (FIDES)
Bernard Nsokika Fonlon; Bernard Fonlon
Food self-sufficiency in Cameroon
Football in Cameroon
Football clubs in Cameroon, list of
Forced labour in Cameroon
Foreign policy of Cameroon
Foreign relations of Cameroon
Andre Fouda
Foumban
Foumban Conference
Joseph Foumbi
Fovu Baham
CFA franc
France
Franco-African Summit
Francophone Cameroonian
Francophone Summit
Organisation internationale de la Francophonie
Freedom of religion in Cameroon
Cameroun
French Equatorial Africa
French language in Cameroon
Front National Unifié (FNU)
Front of Allies for Change (FAC)
Front Populaire de l'Unité et la Paix (FPUP)
John Fru Ndi
FS d'Akonolinga
Fufu; Couscous
Fula language
Fula people
Sokoto Caliphate
Fulani War
Joseph Jackson Fuller

G
Gabon
Vincent Ganty
Garoua
Garri (tapioca)
Gavar language
LGBT rights in Cameroon
Gendarmerie
General Certificate of Education (GCE)
General Confederation of Free Workers of Cameroon (CGTLC)
Geography of Cameroon
George (Duala king)
Sampson A. George
German West Africa Company
Germany
Ghost town operations
Glavda language
Otto Gleim
Goni Waday
Governor (Cameroon)
Grand Batanga
Grand Débat
Grand Prix Chantal Biya
Grassfields (Cameroon)
Great Britain
Green Revolution
George Grenfell
Groupe de Huit
Groupe des Progressistes
Gude language
Guider
Guinean forest–savanna mosaic
Gvoko language

H
Hamadjoda Adjoudji
Souleymanou Hamidou
Hanno the Navigator
Harmonisation (Cameroon); Service d'equivalence
Hauts Plateaux Division
Hayatu ibn Sa'id
List of heads of government of British Cameroons
List of heads of government of Cameroon
List of heads of government of French Cameroon
List of heads of state of Cameroon
Edward H. Hewett
High Court of Justice (Cameroon)
Etienne Hollong
John Holt (businessman)
Holy Ghost Fathers
Hosséré Vokré
Houseboy (novel)
Jeffery Hughes
Human rights in Cameroon
Human Rights Defence Group
Hya language
Hydroelectricity in Cameroon

I
Mohammadou Idrissou
Igbo people
Igbo language
Salle Ibrahim
Jean Ikellé-Matiba
Impôts FC
Indigénat
Indirect rule
Indomitable Lions
Ephraïm Inoni
Interministerial Committee on Intelligence
International Monetary Fund (IMF)
International Relations Institute of Cameroon
Investment code
Guy Ipoua
Samuel Ipoua
La isla misteriosa y el capitán Nemo
Islam in Cameroon
Issa Bakary
Isubu
Johannes Ittman
Imbia Sylvester Itoe

J
Eugene Jamot
Jantzen & Thormählen
Jaunde-Texte von Karl Atangana und Paul Messi
Jengu
Jeunesse Camerounaise Française (JEUCAFRA)
Jeunesse Démocratique Camerounaise (JDC)
Jihad
Jovi (musician)
Jimi language (Cameroon)
Joseph-Désiré Job
Thomas Job
Joint Proclamation
Augustine Ngom Jua

K
Axelle Kabou
Kadéï River
Kadji Sports Academy
Kaélé
Kaïssa
Kako language
P. M. Kale
Simone Kaljob
Raymond Kalla
Samuel Kame
Carlos Kameni
Mathurin Kameni
Kamerun
Kamerun National Congress (KNC)
Kamerun National Democratic Party (KNDP)
Kamerun United National Congress (KUNC)
Kamerun United Party (KUP)
Daniel Kamwa
Kanem-Bornu Empire
Kanuri people
Victor Kanga
Kanuri language
Kenya Airways Flight 507
Kilum-Ijim Forest
Emmanuel Kita Kejuo
Abel Kingue
Kirdi
Eduard von Knorr
Augustin Frédéric Kodock
Koko Komégné
Kol language (Cameroon)
Kom people (Cameroon)
Kom language
Yaphet Koppo
Korup National Park
Kotoko kingdom
Kotoko-Yedina languages
Kotoko people
Maka Kotto
Yaphet Kotto
Augustin Kontchou Kouomegni
Dorge Kouemaha
Kousséri
Kribi
K-Tino
Kumba
Kumbo
Emmanuel Kundé
Kwane a Ngie
Serge Kwetche

L
Mohamadou Labarang
Lagwan language
Lake Chad
Lake Chad Basin Commission (LCBC); Commission du Bassin du Lac Tchad (CBLT)
Lake Chad Catchment
Lake Chad flooded savanna
Lake Monoun
Lake Nyos (Lake Nyos disaster)
Lake Ossa
Lamido
Languages of Cameroon
Lauren Etame Mayer
Law enforcement in Cameroon
League of Nations mandate
Philippe Leclerc de Hauteclocque
LGBT rights in Cameroon (Gay rights)
Limba people (Cameroon)
Limbe; Victoria, Cameroon
Littoral Region (Cameroon)
Lobéké National Park
Lock Priso
Logone River
Loi Cadre
Lolodorf
Lomé Convention
Lomié
Eboa Lotin
Luo language (Atta)
Loum, Cameroon
Lycée Leclerc

M
Daniel Maa Boumsong
Mada language (Cameroon)
David Sydney Maddicott
Wes Madiko
Mafa language
Herman Maimo
Michael Kiessou
Sankie Maimo
Maize in Cameroon
Guy Madjo
Marcel Mahouvé
Maka people
Makaa–Njem languages
Makossa
Jean Makoun
Malaba, Cameroon
Malgbe language
Hugo Mamba-Schlick
Mambila people
Mambila language
Mambiloid languages. 
Mamfe
Mamfe Conference
Mami Wata
List of mammals of Cameroon
Mandara, Rulers of
Mandara Kingdom
Mandara languages
Mandara Mountains
Mandara Plateau mosaic
Mandate System (Cameroon)
Bébé Manga
Rudolf Duala Manga Bell
Mangambeu
Jean Manga-Onguene
Mankon Museum
Myriam Léonie Mani
Mankon
Joseph Merrick (missionary)
Myriam Léonie Mani
Union of the Peoples of Cameroon
Silikam néé Manamourou
Maps of Cameroon
Maroua
Masa languages
The Masked Rider: Cycling in West Africa
Maslam language
Massa language
Philippe Mataga
Matal language
Marvin Matip
Theodore Mayi-Matip
Lauren Etame Mayer
Mayo Kébbi
Mazagway language
Luc Mbah a Moute
Mbalam
Sylvie Mballa Éloundou
Mbalmayo
Mbanga, Cameroon
Mbedam language
Mbuko language
Mefele language
Mésondo
Modeste M'bami
Mbandjock
Françoise Mbango Etone
Prince Nico Mbarga
Coco Mbassi
Robert Mbella Mbappe
Stéphane Mbia
Patrick Mboma
Mbedi a Mbongo
André-Marie Mbida
Nerius Namaso Mbile
Patrick Mboma
Mbongo
Mbouda
Samuel Efoua Mbozo'o
Mbum language
Mbwe-Mbwe
Carole Kaboud Mebam
Meiganga
Merey language
Joseph Merrick (missionary)
Le Messager
Pierre Messmer
Lucien Mettomo
Ousman Mey
Valéry Mézague
Louis-Paul Mfédé
Mfou
Military of Cameroon
Herbert Vaughan
Roger Milla
Millet beer
Mina language (Cameroon)
Mining industry of Cameroon
Ministry of Justice of Cameroon
Minister of State (Cameroon)
Ministry of Women's Affairs (Cameroon)
Mise en valeur
Mofu
Mofu-Gudur language
Mokolo
Moloko language
Monetary Union of Equatorial Africa and Cameroon; Union Monetaire de l'Afrique Equatoriale et Cameroun (UMAEC)
Celestin Monga
Mongo-Beti (Eza Boto; Alexandre Biyidi)
Arno Monkam
Monneba
"Monsieur sans objet"
Moolaadé
Mouloudou
Félix-Roland Moumié
Mount Cameroon
Mount Cameroon and Bioko montane forests
Mount Cameroon F.C.
Mount Cameroon Race of Hope
Mount Kupe
Mount Manengouba
Mount Nlonako
Mountain Chain of the West
Alfred Moussambani
Sarkifada Moussa Yaya
Mouvement d'Action Nationale du Cameroun (MANC)
Mouvement pur la Défence de la Republique; Movement for the Defence of the Republic (MDR)
Movement for Democracy and Progress (MDP)
Mpem and Djim National Park
Victor E. Mukete
Albert Womah Mukong
Salomon Tandeng Muna
Mungo people
Mungo River
List of municipalities of Cameroon
Musgum
Music of Cameroon
Peter Mafany Musonge
Muyang language
Engelbert Mveng
Mvog-Betsi Zoo
Mvolyé
Mvomeka'a

N
Gustav Nachtigal
Antoinette Nana Djimou Ida
Joel Gustave Nana Ngongang
Nanga Eboko
Nation-building
National Airways Cameroon
National Anti-Corruption Observatory
National Army of Kamerun Liberation; Armée de Libération Nationale du Kamerun (ALNK)
National Assembly of Cameroon (Assemblée Nationale du Cameroun; ANCAM)
National Centre for Administration and Magistracy (Centre Nationale d'Administration et de Magistrature; CENAM; École nationale d'administration et de Magistrature; National School for Administration and Magistracy)
National Civil Service for Participation in Development
National Coordination Committee of Opposition Parties (NCCOP)
National Council of Nigeria and the Cameroons (NCNC)
National Day (Cameroon)
National Fund for Rural Development; Fond National de Développement Rural (FONADER)
National Investment Company; Société Nationale d'Investissement (SNI)
National Office for Participation in Development; Office National de Participation au Développement (ONPD)
National parks of Cameroon, list of
National Ports Authority (NPA)
National Produce Marketing Board (NPMB); Office National de Commercialisation des Produits de Base (ONCPB)
National Rehabilitation Center for the Handicapped
National Union of Cameroon Workers (NUCW)
National Union for Democracy and Progress (Cameroon) (NUDP); Union Nationale pour la Démocratie et le Progrès (UNDP)
National Water Corporation of Cameroon; Société Nationale des Eaux du Cameroun (SNEC)
Youth Day
Native Authorities (Cameroon)
Native Baptist Church (NBC)
Adamou Ndam Njoya
Pius Ndiefi
Joseph Ndo
Ndi-samba joseph
Claire Ndi-samba
Ndongmo Affair
Martin Ndongo-Ebanga
Neukamerun
New Deal (Cameroon); Politique du Renouveau
James R. Newby
Georges Ngango
Ngaoundal
Ngaoundéré
Nana Falemi
Ngbe; Egbo
Ngiemboon language
Ngoila
Daniel Ngom Kome
Albert Ngome Kome
Ngondo
Ngong language
Victor Anomah Ngu
Rose Zang Nguele
Mireille Nguimgo
Niger Basin Authority (NBA); Authorite du Bassin du Niger (ABN)
Ngumba language
Ngumba people
Niete
Nigeria
Mbah Ndam Joseph Njang
Pierre Njanka
Pius Njawe
Njem
Dorothy Limunga Njeuma
Geremi Njitap
Jérémie N'Jock
Ibrahim Njoya
Seidou Njimoluh Njoya
Nki National Park
Alice Nkom
Alain N'Kong
Nkongsamba
Thomas Nkono
Jean Nkuete
Stan Nkwain
George Nkwe
North Giziga language
North Kamerun Democratic Party
North Mofu language
North Region (Cameroon)
Northern Cameroons
Northern Congolian forest–savanna mosaic
Northern Massacre
Northwest Region (Cameroon); Northwest Region, Cameroon
 Northwestern Congolian lowland forests
Nshare
Nsibidi
Nso people
Ntarinkon Palace
Ntem River
Ntumazah Ndeh
Kristo Numpuby
Sally Nyolo
Nyong River
Nzanyi language
Anne-Marie Nzié
Nzime

O
O Cameroon, Cradle of Our Forefathers
Obala
Office Camerounais du Bananes
Mama Ohandja
Rene-Guy Charles Okala
Oku
Salomon Olembé
Cameroon at the 1964 Summer Olympics
Cameroon at the 1976 Summer Olympics
Cameroon at the 1980 Summer Olympics
Cameroon at the 1984 Summer Olympics
Cameroon at the 1988 Summer Olympics
Cameroon at the 1992 Summer Olympics
Cameroon at the 1996 Summer Olympics
Cameroon at the 2000 Summer Olympics
Cameroon at the 2004 Summer Olympics
Cameroon at the 2008 Summer Olympics
François Omam-Biyik
Charles Onana Awana
One Kamerun Party (OK)
Organisation of African Unity (OAU)
Oryx Douala
Oshie
Otélé
The Overloaded Ark
Ernest Ouandie
Owona Constitution
Joseph Owona
Ferdinand Oyono
Ferdinand-Leopold Oyono

P
Pagan grouping; Societes paiennes
Palestine sunbird
Pallottine mission to Kamerun
Palm products in Cameroon
Palm wine
Panthère de Bangangté
Parti des Démocrates Camerounais (PDC)
Parti Socialiste Camerounaise (PSC)
Parti Travailliste Camerounais
Parti Unifié
Passport, Cameroonian
Peace Corps
"Peace-Work-Fatherland"
Michel Pensée
People's Republic of China
Saint-John Perse
Petit-Pays
Petroleum in Cameroon
Planned liberalism
List of political parties in Cameroon
Paul Pondi
Pori people
Christian Pouga
Louis-Marie Pouka
Roland Pré
Prefet; Senior Divisional Officer
Presbyterianism in Cameroon
Prestation
Prime Minister of Cameroon
Priso a Doo
Privatisation in Cameroon
Privatization of the electricity sector in Cameroon
Prostitution in Cameroon
Protestantism in Cameroon
Psikye language
Public holidays in Cameroon
Jesko von Puttkamer
Pygmies

Q

R
Rabih az-Zubayr
Racing FC Bafoussam
Radio trottoir
Rail transport in Cameroon
Railway stations in Cameroon
Ralliement
Ramadan
Jean Ramadier
Rassemblement Camerounais (RACAM)
Rassemblement Démocratique Africain (RDA)
Rassemblement du Peuple Camerounais (RAPECA)
Rassemblement du Peuple Camerounais (RPC)
Regional Council (Cameroon)
Regions of Cameroon
Religion in Cameroon
Renaissance Camerounaise (RENAICAM)
Republic of Cameroon
Republique du Cameroun
Research Institute for Development, Communication and School Partnership
Residents of Cameroons Province
Reunification (Cameroon)
Rhumsiki
Rice in Cameroon
"rigor and moralisation"
Roman Catholic Archdiocese of Bamenda
Roman Catholic Archdiocese of Bertoua
Roman Catholic Archdiocese of Douala
Roman Catholic Archdiocese of Garoua
Roman Catholic Archdiocese of Yaoundé
Roman Catholic dioceses in Cameroon, list of
Roman Catholic Diocese of Bafia
Roman Catholic Diocese of Bafoussam
Roman Catholic Diocese of Batouri
Roman Catholic Diocese of Buéa
Roman Catholic Diocese of Doumé–Abong’ Mbang
Roman Catholic Diocese of Ebolowa
Roman Catholic Diocese of Edéa
Roman Catholic Diocese of Eséka
Roman Catholic Diocese of Kribi
Roman Catholic Diocese of Kumbo
Roman Catholic Diocese of Mamfe
Roman Catholic Diocese of Maroua–Mokolo
Roman Catholic Diocese of Mbalmayo
Roman Catholic Diocese of Ngaoundéré
Roman Catholic Diocese of Nkongsamba
Roman Catholic Diocese of Obala
Roman Catholic Diocese of Sangmélima
Roman Catholic Diocese of Yagoua
Roman Catholic Diocese of Yokadouma
Roman Catholicism in Cameroon
Rosicrucianism
Rubber in Cameroon
Rural exodus in Cameroon

S
Samuel Efoua Mbozo'o
Sa'a, Cameroon
Félix Sabal Lecco (musician)
Félix Sabal Lecco (politician)
Stanley Enow
Sable FC
Sahel
Sahel FC
Alioum Saidou
St. Joseph's College, Sasse
Alfred Saker
Saker Baptist College
Ahmadou Salatou
Martin-Paul Samba
Lotin Same
Sanaga River
Sangha River
Sangmélima
Sao civilisation
Les Scouts du Cameroun
Second Extraordinary Congress of Cameroon National Union
Secret agreements between Cameroon and France
Secretariat-General at the Presidency
Les Saignantes
Theodor Seitz
Self-reliant development (développement autocentre)
Pierre Semengue
Semi-Bantu
Senate of Cameroon
Felix Sengat-Kuo
Service d'Etudes et de la Documentation
Sharwa language
Shu Mom
Dominique Sima Fouda
Augustine Simo
Thérèse Sita-Bella
Slavery in Cameroon
Slave trade in Cameroon
Smuggling in Cameroon
Socatral
Social Democratic Front (SDF)
Social justice
Société Camerounaise de Banque scandal
Société Camerounaise des Tabacs (SCT)
Société de Développement de la Riziculture dans le Plaine de Mbo (SODERIM)
Société de Développement pour la Culture et la Transformation du Blé (SODEBLE)
Société d'Expansion et de Modernisation de la Riziculture de Yagoua (SEMRY)
Société du Développement du Nkam (SODENKAM)
Société Financière de Recouvrement
Société Nationale des Hydrocarbures (SNH)
Sociétés Cooperatives de Développement Rural (SOCOODER)
Julius von Soden
Rameau Thierry Sokoudjou
Sokoto
Sokoto Grand Vizier
List of Sultans of Sokoto
Thomas Som
Alexandre Song
Rigobert Song
Jacques Songo'o
Soppo
Paul Soppo Priso
SOSOCAM
Andre Soucadaux
South Cameroon Plateau
South Region (Cameroon)
Southern Cameroon national football team
Southwest Region (Cameroon)
Southern Cameroons
Southern Cameroons National Council (SCNC)
Southern Cameroons Youth League (SCYL)
South Giziga language
Nzante Spee
Sport in Cameroon
Sso (rite)
Stabilisation of Export Earnings (STABEX)
Stade Akwa
Stade de Baham
Stade de Batié
Stade Municipal (Bafang)
Stade Municipal de Bafoussam
Stade Municipal de Bamendzi
Stade Municipal de Guider
Stade de la Réunification
Stade de Mbouda
Stade de Moliko
Roumdé Adjia Stadium
Ahmadou Ahidjo Stadium
Statut du Cameroun
Structural Adjustment Programs (SAP)
Patrick Suffo
Sugar in Cameroon
Supreme Court of Cameroon
"Sweet Mother"
SYSMIN

T
Maurice Tadadjeu
Carlos Takam
Takumbeng; Takembeng
Elisabeth Tankeu
James Tabe Tataw
Tatum, Cameroon
Tchabal Gangdaba
Alphonse Tchami
Bill Tchato
Jean-Pierre Tchetchoua
Vroumsia Tchinaye
Jean-Michel Tchouga
Simon Pierre Tchoungui
Jerry-Christian Tchuissé
Tea in Cameroon
Teachers Association of Cameroon
Paul Tessa
Les Têtes Brulées
Theatre in Cameroon
Johannes Thong Likeng
Amour Patrick Tignyemb
Tikar; Tikari
Tiko
Tillier Affair
Timber in Cameroon
Tobacco in Cameroon
Barthélémy Toguo
Tombel Massacre
Tonnerre Yaoundé
Tontine; Njangi
Felix Tonye Mbog
Xavier Torre
Tourism in Cameroon
Jacques_Toussele
Trans-Cameroon Railway
Transport in Cameroon
Treaty of Fez
Tripartite Conference
United Nations Trust Territories
Trusteeship system
Tsamassi
Delpine Tsanga
Tsuvan language
Christian Tumi
Tupuri language
Tupuri people

U
Reuben Um Nyobé
Unification Day (Cameroon)
Union Camerounaise (UC)
Union des Populations du Cameroun; Union of the Peoples of Cameroon (UPC)
Union Douala
Union Douanière Économique de l'Afrique Centrale (UDEAC); Central African Customs and Economic Union (CACEU)
Union for Change
Union of Free Trade Unions of Cameroon (USLC)
Unisport de Bafang
United Nations 1961 plebiscite
United Nations Security Council Resolution 133
United Republic of Cameroon
List of universities in Cameroon
Unity Palace; Etoudi Palace
Université FC de Ngaoundéré
University of Yaoundé
Urbanisation in Cameroon
Usman dan Fodio

V
Vame language
Paul Verdzekov
Victoria Botanical Gardens
Heinrich Vieter
Volcanic Sprint
Vollarbe

W
Geoffrey Wainwright
Justice Wamfor
Waza National Park
Pierre Webó
Nicole Werewere-Liking
West Africa Campaign (World War I)
West Cameroon
West Cameroon House of Chiefs
West Region (Cameroon)
Western High Plateau
Wheat in Cameroon
William I of Bimbia
William II of Bimbia
Johannes Manga Williams
Wodaabe
Pierre Womé
Women in Cameroon
World Bank
World War I Kamerun campaigns
Cameroonian participation in World War II
Wouri River
Wovea
Wum
Wuzlam language

X

Y
Fosi Yakum-Ntaw
Yaoundé
Yaoundé Agreements
Yaoundé Airport
Yaoundé Convention
Yaoundé Nsimalen International Airport
Yaoundé Plan of Action
Yaoundé train explosion
Yeni language
Yillaga
Gisele Yitamben
Yokadouma
Philémon Yang

Z
Zambo Commission
Rose Zang Nguele
Eugen von Zimmerer
Eugene Zintgraff
Jean Zoa
Zone de Pacification (ZOPAC)
Zones d'Action Prioritaires Integrées (ZAPI)
Zumaya language

 
Cameroon